Waingaro River is the name of two rivers in New Zealand.
 Waingaro River (Tasman)
 Waingaro River (Waikato)